Jessica Rodríguez (born 1982) is a pageant titleholder.

Jessica Rodríguez may also refer to

 Jessica Rodríguez (hurdler) (born 1975), Spanish hurdler
 Jessica Rodríguez (runner) (born 1976), Mexican marathon runner

See also 

 Jessica Feshbach or Jessica Feshbach Rodriguez, Scientology spokesperson